Pachygonidia hopfferi is a moth of the family Sphingidae.

Distribution 
It is known from Panama and Costa Rica and has been recorded as far south as Bolivia.

Description 
The wingspan is about 74 mm. There is a grey-brown submarginal patch on the forewing upperside and the outer edge of the dark postmedian band is smooth. There are three median transverse rose-pinkish bands on the hindwing upperside.

Biology 
There are probably multiple generations per year.

The larvae probably feed on  Doliocarpus dentatus, Doliocarpus multiflorus and Tetracera hydrophila.

References

Pachygonidia
Moths described in 1875